Bratteli is a surname. Notable people with the surname include:

Ola Bratteli (1946–2015), Norwegian mathematician
Randi Bratteli (1924–2002), Norwegian journalist
Trygve Bratteli (1910–1984), Norwegian newspaper editor and politician